The Salamander is a 1971 Swiss drama film directed by Alain Tanner. The film was selected as the Swiss entry for the Best Foreign Language Film at the 45th Academy Awards, but was not accepted as a nominee.

Plot
A young woman is accused of having shot her uncle, but she claims he accidentally shot himself while cleaning his gun. Two friends are commissioned to write a film script based on this incident. Each of them chooses an approach in accordance with his profession. The journalist interviews the young woman, yet her statements seem to be contradictory. The novelist invents fictitious explanations which seem plausible, but, when he gets to know the woman, she's very different from what he has imagined. In the end, both refrain from working on this film project.

Cast
 Bulle Ogier as Rosemonde
 Jean-Luc Bideau as Pierre
 Jacques Denis as Paul
 Véronique Alain as Suzanne
 Daniel Stuffel as the boss at the shoe shop
 Marblum Jequier as Paul's wife (as Marblum Jéquier)
 Marcel Vidal as Rosemonde's uncle
 Dominique Catton as Roger
 Violette Fleury as the mother of the boss at the shoe shop
 Mista Préchac as Rosemonde's mother

See also
 List of submissions to the 45th Academy Awards for Best Foreign Language Film
 List of Swiss submissions for the Academy Award for Best Foreign Language Film

References

External links
 

1971 films
1970s French-language films
1971 drama films
Swiss drama films
Swiss black-and-white films
Films directed by Alain Tanner
French-language Swiss films